FLYER is a monthly magazine for the UK general aviation community. It is published by Seager Publishing. The Magazine competes with Pilot and advertising-based freesheet, Loop. The headquarters of FLYER is in Bath.

FLYER is perhaps best known for the Flyer Forums, an online discussion forum focussing on the general aviation (GA) community.

References

External links
 

Aviation magazines
Monthly magazines published in the United Kingdom
Magazines established in 1990
Mass media in Bath, Somerset